Cecily Legler Strong (born February 8, 1984) is an American actress, comedian, producer, author, and singer. Strong is most notable for being a cast member on the NBC sketch comedy series Saturday Night Live from 2012 to 2022. She is also the longest-tenured female cast member in the show's history. After graduation from the Chicago Academy for the Arts, she began to perform at The Second City. Strong was hired for SNL while doing improv at The Second City in Chicago, where she moved after graduating from CalArts. She currently has a starring role in the Apple TV+ musical comedy series Schmigadoon! (2021–present), which she also co-produces.

Her other roles include voice work on The Awesomes (2013–2015), supporting roles in films like Ghostbusters, The Meddler, and The Female Brain. She hosted the White House Correspondents' Dinner in 2015. Her first book, the memoir This Will All Be Over Soon, was published in 2021.

For her work on Saturday Night Live, she was nominated for Outstanding Supporting Actress in a Comedy Series at the 72nd and 73rd Primetime Emmy Awards.

Early life
Strong was born in Springfield, Illinois, and was raised in Oak Park, an inner ring suburb of Chicago. She is the daughter of Penelope and William "Bill" Strong, who worked as an Associated Press bureau chief and as of 2013 ran his own public relations firm. Penny Legler Strong is a nurse practitioner, having worked extensively at area hospitals. Strong's parents are divorced. Strong grew up adoring SNL as a child, reenacting sketches with her friend and watching old SNL commercials on VHS. "I had a tape of the best commercials, and I wore it out, every day." She has stated that she was inspired by Phil Hartman.

In a 2021 interview with Terry Gross on the National Public Radio program Fresh Air, Strong said that because her uncle is a Broadway producer, as a child she often was able to attend Broadway shows and sometimes go back stage to meet their casts.

She attended Oak Park and River Forest High School until her sophomore year, when she was expelled for bringing marijuana to school. She then attended a private Catholic school until transferring for her senior year to the Chicago Academy for the Arts, where she graduated in 2002. She then studied acting at California Institute of the Arts (CalArts), graduating in 2006 with a BFA in theatre. After graduating, Strong returned to Chicago where she studied at the Second City Conservatory and iO Chicago.

Career
Strong performed regularly at The Second City and iO Chicago. Strong performed on a cruise ship with other Second City members for four months. She appeared at the Chicago Sketch Fest, Chicago Just for Laughs, the New York Sketchfest, the Edinburgh Fringe Festival, the Goodman Theater, the Bailiwick Theater, the Mercury Theater, and with the all-female improv troupe Virgin Daiquiri.

Saturday Night Live
Strong debuted as a featured player on Saturday Night Live on September 15, 2012. The next season, Strong became a repertory player and co-anchored the recurring Weekend Update segment with Seth Meyers, beginning with the season 39 premiere. Strong later co-anchored with Colin Jost, and was replaced on Weekend Update with writer Michael Che, beginning with the season 40 premiere in September 2014, partly at her own request to focus on doing sketches as a part of the regular cast. In 2020, Strong was nominated for her first Primetime Emmy award for Outstanding Supporting Actress In A Comedy Series for her work on the show. She was nominated again in 2021. She was also nominated for Best Supporting Actress in a Comedy Series at the 12th Critics' Choice Television Awards.

Strong drew praise from abortion-rights supporters, and strong backlash from abortion opponents, after appearing in a comedy skit, "Goober the Clown Who Had An Abortion When She Was 23," during a "Weekend Update" sketch on the November 6, 2021, episode.  The sketch followed U.S. Supreme Court oral arguments in two cases relating to the Texas Heartbeat Act.  Strong later confirmed on her Instagram account that the sketch referenced her own abortion. Strong followed up on the commentary a year later, during a "Weekend Update" sketch on the November 5, 2022, episode, appearing as "Tammy the Trucker on Gas Prices and Definitely Not Abortion" before the 2022 midterm elections.

Strong returned to SNL for season 48, and passed former castmate Kate McKinnon as the longest-running female cast member in the show's history, though she missed the first three shows of the season reprising her role in the play The Search for Signs of Intelligent Life in the Universe in Los Angeles. She returned on the October 29, 2022, episode. Strong passed McKinnon's record with the December 17, 2022, episode, which would ultimately be her last.

Recurring characters
The Girl You Wish You Hadn't Started a Conversation with at a Party, an unintelligent, unnamed pseudo-activist,
Dana, a loud-mouthed, unfriendly retail employee who along with Niff (played by Bobby Moynihan) always insults her coworkers out of fear of being fired,
Donna Fingerneck, The Art of the Encounter and Women in the Workplace co-host with Jodi Cork (played by Kate McKinnon),
Heather, a one-dimensional female character from a male-driven comedy,
Kyra, co-host of The Girlfriends Talk Show, alongside Morgan (played by Aidy Bryant),
Cathy Anne, the drug-addicted neighbor of Michael Che (usually introduced by Che as "the woman who's always yelling outside my window"), who has strong opinions on current events,
 An unnamed blond former porn star-turned-model/commercial actress who hawks elegant items alongside Brookie (played by Vanessa Bayer),
Gemma, an aspiring British singer with various boyfriends,
Gracelynn Chisholm, co-host of morning show Right Side of the Bed with her husband Cory (played by Taran Killam),
Joelle LaRue, one of the two French animal-based video clip show presenters, alongside Noelle LeSoup (played by Kate McKinnon),
 Lonnie, one of the two unintelligent kids (the other being Josh, played by Mikey Day) in the Science Room sketches.

Celebrity impersonations

 Huma Abedin
 Julie Andrews
 Brooke Baldwin
 Maria Bartiromo
 Marsha Blackburn
 John Bolton
 Gloria Borger
 Paula Broadwell
 Rachel Brosnahan
 Erin Burnett
 Gina Carano
 Liz Cheney
 Marion Cotillard
 Susan Collins
 Olivia Colman
 Stormy Daniels
 Lana Del Rey
 Catherine Deneuve
 Fran Drescher
 Gloria Estefan
 Dianne Feinstein
 Carly Fiorina
 Tulsi Gabbard
 Ariana Grande
 Marjorie Taylor Greene
 Kimberly Guilfoyle
 Hope Hicks
 Scottie Nell Hughes
 Abby Huntsman
 Anjelica Huston
 Kendall Jenner
 Khloe Kardashian
 Jill Kelley
 Megyn Kelly
 Sarah Koenig
 Becca Kufrin
 Kari Lake
 Tara Lipinski
 Rachel Maddow
 Kate Middleton
 Lin-Manuel Miranda
 Liza Minnelli
 Alanis Morissette
 Judge Jeanine Pirro
 Sidney Powell
 Michelle Rodriguez
 Kyrsten Sinema
 Ivana Trump
 Melania Trump
 Sofia Vergara
 Gretchen Whitmer
 Allison Williams
 Alexandria Ocasio-Cortez

Other work
Strong was the featured entertainer at the 2015 White House Correspondents' Association dinner. She took digs at the various news organizations in attendance, politicians of all persuasions, and President Obama. She also took shots at the US Secret Service, host location the Washington Hilton, Brian Williams, Sarah Koenig and the state of Indiana.

In 2016, she appeared in a commercial for Old Navy, alongside other SNL cast members Nasim Pedrad and Jay Pharoah. That year, Strong also joined the climate change documentary show Years of Living Dangerously as a celebrity correspondent. In 2016, she guest starred as Samantha Stevens in TBS's Angie Tribeca and Catherine Hobart in Fox's Scream Queens. She has appeared in a series of commercials for Triscuit since 2017.  Starting in 2020 she starred in a series of Prego Spaghetti sauce commercials and in 2022 she was in several Verizon commercials featuring Apple+ TV with several co-stars including Adam Scott and Julian Edelman.

Her first book, a memoir titled This Will All Be Over Soon, was published on August 10, 2021. The book addresses "the challenges of beginning in a relationship during the pandemic; the pain of losing family and friends; the pivotal events of her life that shaped her; and the importance of gratitude for each passing day." It developed from an essay she wrote about grieving the loss of her cousin Owen to brain cancer in the middle of the COVID-19 pandemic that was first published on Vulture.com in 2020.

In 2021, Strong appeared in HBO Max's six-part comedy series That Damn Michael Che, featuring SNL castmate Michael Che. The same year, she starred in, and was a producer for, Schmigadoon!, a musical parody series on Apple TV+. Developed by Cinco Paul and Ken Daurio, and produced by SNL's Lorne Michaels, the series centers around a couple (played by Strong and Keegan-Michael Key) stuck in a 1940s studio musical town until they find "true love".

It was announced in October 2021 that Strong would make her New York stage debut at the end of the year in an Off Broadway revival of Jane Wagner's one-woman play The Search for Signs of Intelligent Life in the Universe, which starred Lily Tomlin in 1985. Directed by Leigh Silverman, the show opened at The Shed on January 11, 2022.

Filmography

Film

Television

Awards and nominations

Critics' Choice Television Awards

Drama League Awards

Grammy Awards

Online Film & Television Association Awards

Primetime Emmy Awards

References

External links
 
 
 Official SNL cast biography

1984 births
Living people
21st-century American actresses
Actresses from Illinois
American film actresses
American impressionists (entertainers)
American television actresses
American voice actresses
American women comedians
California Institute of the Arts alumni
Actors from Oak Park, Illinois
People from Springfield, Illinois
American sketch comedians
Comedians from Illinois
21st-century American comedians